Bolechowo refers to the following places in Poland:

 Bolechowo, Greater Poland Voivodeship
 Bolechowo, West Pomeranian Voivodeship